Yorima is a genus of araneomorph spiders in the family Cybaeidae, and was first described by R. V. Chamberlin & Wilton Ivie in 1942. Originally placed in the funnel weaver family, it was moved to the Dictynidae in 1967, and to the Cybaeidae in 2017.

Species
 it contains six species in the United States and Cuba:
Yorima albida Roth, 1956 – USA
Yorima angelica Roth, 1956 – USA
Yorima antillana (Bryant, 1940) – Cuba
Yorima flava (Chamberlin & Ivie, 1937) – USA
Yorima sequoiae (Chamberlin & Ivie, 1937) (type) – USA
Yorima subflava Chamberlin & Ivie, 1942 – USA

References

External links
Yorima at BugGuide

Araneomorphae genera
Cybaeidae
Spiders of North America